Daniel Ciugureanu (9 December 1885 – 19 May 1950) was a Romanian politician from Bessarabia, deputy in Sfatul Țării from Chișinău, Prime Minister of the Moldavian Democratic Republic from –, Minister for Bessarabia in four Romanian Governments, Deputy and Senator, Vice-President of the Chamber of Deputies, Vice-President and President of the Senate of Kingdom of Romania.

He was born in 1885 in Șirăuți, Khotinsky Uyezd, in the Bessarabia Governorate of the Russian Empire, the son of Alexandru Ciugureanu, a priest, and his wife, Ecaterina, a teacher. After attending secondary school  in Bălți and the theological seminary in Chișinău, he enrolled in 1905 at the Kiev Imperial University of Saint Vladimir, graduating from medical school in 1912.

Ciugureanu was one of the founders and leaders of the National Moldavian Party and one of the promoters of the Union of Bessarabia with Romania. On , the Sfatul Țării voted unanimously to proclaim the independence of the Moldavian Democratic Republic. The Board of Directors became the Council of Ministers, and Ciugureanu was elected Prime Minister of the new republic.

After the Union of Bessarabia with Romania he served as minister for Bessarabia in four Romanian governments from 9 April 1918 to 30 November 1919.

Ciugureanu was arrested on 5 May 1950 by the communist authorities of Romania. While being transported in a van, he had a stroke at Turda. According to some sources, he died at a nearby hospital the next day; according to official records of the Securitate, he died several days later at Sighet Prison.

See also 
 Daniel Ciugureanu Cabinet

References

External links
 Memorial of the Victims of Communism and of the Resistance

 

1885 births
1950 deaths
People from Briceni District
People from Khotinsky Uyezd
Romanian people of Moldovan descent
Taras Shevchenko National University of Kyiv alumni
Moldovan physicians
20th-century Romanian physicians
Moldovan independence activists
Socialist Revolutionary Party politicians
Moldovan MPs 1917–1918
Prime Ministers of Moldova
Members of the Romanian Cabinet
Grand Crosses of the Order of the Crown (Romania)
Grand Officers of the Order of the Star of Romania
Recipients of the National Order of Faithful Service
Inmates of Sighet prison
Prisoners who died in Securitate custody
Romanian people who died in prison custody
Burials at Cernica Monastery Cemetery